Joseph Wortis (October 2, 1906 – February 22, 1995) was an American psychiatrist, longtime editor of the scientific journal Biological Psychiatry, and a professor at the State University of New York at Stony Brook.

Early life
Joseph Wortis was born in Brooklyn, New York, one of five children of Jewish immigrant parents (his father Russian-Jewish, his mother Alsatian-Jewish). He attended New York University, where he majored in English literature before switching to pre-med. He graduated in 1927. Accepted into Yale medical school, he went instead to Europe and studied medicine in Vienna (1927-32), Munich and Paris.

Career 
Upon returning to the United States, Wortis became a psychiatric resident at Bellevue hospital in New York. In 1934 he married Helen Zunser, the daughter of a prominent New York Jewish literary family. In the same year, funded by a fellowship sponsored by the English psychologist Havelock Ellis, whom Wortis had met while vacationing in England in 1927. His first act in the fellowship was to travel to Vienna to spend 4 months in psychoanalysis with Sigmund Freud. He then studied in Vienna and London until 1940. He published a book about this experience in 1954. 

While in Vienna, he observed Manfred Sakel perform insulin shock therapy of schizophrenia and introduced this treatment subsequently in the United States. For his book Soviet Psychiatry, Wortis visited the Soviet Union and taught himself Russian. Because of this, he was investigated by the United States Senate Subcommittee on Internal Security in 1953. Over his career, Wortis worked at several hospitals and medical schools, including Johns Hopkins School of Medicine, the Columbia University College of Physicians and Surgeons, and the New York University School of Medicine. Wortis was the founding editor of the journal Biological Psychiatry in 1965 and remained in this function until 1992. Wortis died in 1995 at the age of 88.

References

American psychiatrists
1906 births
1995 deaths
Analysands of Sigmund Freud
American people of Russian-Jewish descent
Alsatian Jews
20th-century American physicians
Stony Brook University faculty
Place of birth missing
Medical journal editors